The Derbi Barceloní ("Barcelonian derby"), is the name given to football matches between FC Barcelona and RCD Espanyol. Both clubs are located in the Barcelona metropolitan area, Spain.

Rivalry 
In the first half of the 20th century during the Miguel Primo de Rivera dictatorship (1923–1930), FC Barcelona was the embodiment of the oppressed Catalan sentiment, in stark contrast to RCD Espanyol which cultivated a kind of compliance to the central authority. 
 
In 1918, the municipalities of Catalonia promoted a campaign to request the Spanish Government a Statute of Autonomy. FC Barcelona joined that request and the Catalan press explained it by saying "FC Barcelona has become the club of Catalonia". The other team of the city, RCD Espanyol were dissociated from the claim.

On numerous occasions RCD Espanyol have complained of an unfavorable treatment which is sometimes directly offensive according to them, towards the club in favor of FC Barcelona by some public media dependent on the Generalitat of Catalonia like TV3.

Despite these differences in ideology, the derbi has always been more relevant to Espanyol supporters than Barcelona ones due to the difference in objectives.

Background and history 
Though it is the most played local derby in the history of La Liga, it is also the most unbalanced, with Barcelona overwhelmingly dominant. In the league table, Espanyol has only managed to finish above Barça on three occasions in almost 70 years and the only all-Catalan Copa del Rey final was won by Barça in 1957. Espanyol has the consolation of achieving the largest margin win with a 6–0 in 1951.

In 1996, Barcelona came out on top when the teams were drawn together in the cup semi-finals, although they lost the final to Atlético Madrid. In 2000, the possibility of another derby final evaporated after Barcelona forfeited the second leg of their semi, coincidentally also against Atlético Madrid, in protest at fixture congestion which badly weakened their squad; Espanyol overcame both Real Madrid in their semi and Atlético in the final. The Pericos also claimed the trophy in 2006 and qualified for the 2006 Supercopa de España where they met league champions Barcelona – the Blaugrana winning 4–0 on aggregate.

On 8 June 2007, Espanyol achieved a 2–2 draw against Barça in the penultimate day of the championship, making it possible for Real Madrid to win the 2006–07 La Liga in their next match at the Bernabeu. This match is popularly remembered with the name of Tamudazo, for Raúl Tamudo, the Espanyol player who scored the goal for the draw. Espanyol achieved a 2–1 win against Barça during 2008–09, becoming the first team to defeat Barcelona at Camp Nou in their treble-winning season.

Espanyol moved to their new RCDE Stadium in 2009, but it was not until their tenth meeting with Barcelona at their new arena that they were able to win a derby fixture (three draws, six defeats), winning 1–0 in the 2017–18 Copa del Rey quarter-final, first leg on 17 January 2018. However, Barcelona overturned this 2–0 at the Camp Nou the following week to go through in the tie, the tenth time in succession (since 1961) that Barça had progressed in the domestic Cup. Three years earlier, Barcelona had also won the 2014–15 Copa del Rey by beating Athletic Bilbao, with the Basques having ended Espanyol's hopes, and the chance of a Catalan showpiece, in the semi-finals.

As of 2019, Barças Lionel Messi who made his debut in the Derby, has scored 25 goals against Espanyol, the most in the history of the derby.

Espanyol lost 1–0 to Barcelona on 8 July 2020 to be relegated to the Segunda División for the first time since 1994.

All matches 
As of 31 December 2022

Major competitions

Minor and defunct competitions

League

Cup

Spanish Super Cup

Inter-Cities Fairs Cup

Head-to-head ranking in La Liga (1929–2022) 

• Total: Espanyol with 4 higher finishes, FC Barcelona with 83 higher finishes (as of the end of the 2021–22 season).

Players who played for both sides 

 1902:  Gustavo Green
 1904:  George Meyer
 1911:  José Quirante
 1911:  Francisco Bru
 1911:  Alfredo Massana
 1911:  José Berdié
 1911:  José Irízar
 1911:  Luis Reñé (via Casual SC)
 1911:  Charles Wallace
 1911:  Percival Wallace
 1912:  Antonio Morales
 1912:  Pere Molins
 1912:  Frank Allack
 1912:  Carles Comamala (via Universitary SC)
 1913:  Félix de Pomés (via Universitary SC, then Casual SC)
 1913:  José Berrondo
 1913:  Luis Bru
 1913:  Francisco Armet
 1913:  Manuel Lemmel (via Universitary SC)
 1914:  Gabriel Bau (via FC Espanya)
 1915:  Santiago Massana
 1915:  Arsenio Morales
 1916:  Casimiro Mallorquí
 1917:  Joaquim Alfaro
 1918:  Josep Julià
 1918:  Buenaventura Vergés
 1919:  Josep Segarra (via Sabadell, then FC Espanya)
 1919:  Climent Gràcia (via FC Internacional)
 1920:  Ramon Álvarez
 1922:  Ricardo Zamora
 1922:  Luis Blanco
 1923:  Baldiri Elías
 1923:  Marià Homs
 1923:  José Landazabal (via FC Martinenc)
 1926:  Vicente Tonijuán (via UE Sants)
 1928:  Manuel Buj García
 1929:  Ramón Parera
 1930:  Cristòfol Solà
 1931:  Conrad Portas Burcet
 1931:  Francesc Bussot (via CE Júpiter)
 1932:  Josep Sastre
 1932:  Manuel Oró Comas (via Sabadell)
 1932:  Antonio Franco
 1933:  José Padrón (via Sevilla)
 1933:  Martí Ventolrà (via Sevilla)
 1933:  Enrique Mas Mirandas
 1933:  Alejandro Morera
 1933:  Cristóbal Martí
 1934:  Josep Escolà
 1934:  Esteban Cifuentes
 1935:  Ramón Lecuona
 1937:  Severiano Goiburu (via Valencia)
 1939:  Joan Morral Tarrés
 1943:  Jaume Elías
 1943:  Juan Sans Alsina (via Zaragoza, then Sabadell)
 1943:  Josep Aguilar (via Celta Vigo, then Sabadell)
 1945:  Juli Gonzalvo (via Zaragoza, then Sabadell)
 1946:  Amador Lorenzo (via EC Granollers, then Real Madrid)
 1947:  Basilio Nieto (via CD Castellón)
 1947:  Jaume Sospedra 
 1949:  Valero (via Gimnàstic, then Granada)
 1951:  Joan Babot (via Gimnàstic, then Real Valladolid)
 1951:  Vicente Colino Hierro (via Sabadell)
 1952:  Isidro Flotats
 1952:  Joaquín Tejedor
 1957:  Dagoberto Moll (via Condal)
 1961:  Zoltán Czibor
 1962:  Antoni Camps
 1963:  Justo Tejada (via Real Madrid)
 1963:  László Kubala
 1966:  Cayetano Ré
 1969:  Marcial Pina
 1969:  Ramoní (via Granada)
 1972:  José Luis Romero (via Sabadell)
 1976:  Pepito Ramos
 1979:  Williams Silvio
 1979:  Canito 
 1979:  Paco Fortes
 1979:  Alfredo Amarillo (via UD Salamanca)
 1980:  Jordi Carreño
 1981:  Urruti
 1981:  Miquel Corominas (via UD Salamanca)
 1982:  Urbano Ortega
 1986:  Pichi Alonso
 1988:  Miquel Soler
 1988:  Ernesto Valverde
 1989:  Steve Archibald (via Hibernian)
 1992:  Fernando Muñoz (via Real Madrid)
 1995:  Cristóbal Parralo (via Real Oviedo)
 1995:  Luis Cembranos
 1999:  Roger
 1999:  Toni Velamazán (via Real Oviedo, then Albacete, then Extremadura)
 2000:  Óscar (via Valencia)
 2002:  Iván de la Peña (via Lazio)
 2002:  Xavi Roca (via Villarreal)
 2003:  Jordi Cruyff (via Manchester United, then Alavés)
 2004:  Dani García (via Zaragoza)
 2006:  Francisco Rufete (via Toledo, then Málaga, then Valencia)
 2009:  Jonathan Soriano
 2009:  Joan Verdú (via Deportivo La Coruña)
 2010:  Sergio García (via Zaragoza, then Real Betis)
 2012:  Simão (via Benfica, then Atlético Madrid, then Beşiktaş)
 2012:  Víctor Sánchez (via Neuchâtel Xamax)
 2013:  Abraham González (via Cádiz, then Gimnàstic, then Alcorcón)
 2014:  Paco Montañés (via 4 clubs)
 2018:  Philippe Coutinho (via Inter Milan, then Liverpool)
 2020:  Oier Olazábal (via Granada, then Real Sociedad, then Levante)
 2021:  Aleix Vidal (via Sevilla)
 2022:  Martin Braithwaite
 2023:  Denis Suarez (via RC Celta de Vigo)

 Individual records 
As of 8 July 2020
 Most appearances made: 36, Xavi (1998–2015)
 Most goals scored: 25, Lionel Messi (2004–2020)
 Most hat-tricks scored: 3, Lionel Messi (2004–2020)
 Most assists provided: 11, Lionel Messi (2004–2020)

 Women's Derbi barceloní 
The women's teams of Barcelona and Espanyol are among the most successful in Spain, claiming 7 Primera División titles (Barça 6 / Espanyol 1) and 14 Copas de la Reina (Barça'' 8 / Espanyol 6) between them since the 1980s. However, since lifting the cup in 2012, Espanyol have not come close to winning either trophy, while Barcelona have grown stronger, building on their league victory that same season with three more consecutive titles and four cup wins in the six subsequent campaigns to 2017–18. In the 2020-21 season, the derby was played at the Camp Nou, the first time women's teams played a competitive match at the stadium. At the end of that season, Espanyol were relegated for the first time in their history, as Barcelona went on to win a continental treble, a first for a Spanish women's club team.

See also 
Catalan football championship
El Clásico
List of association football rivalries
Madrid derby 
List of sports rivalries
Nationalism and sport

References

External links 
Official La Liga Web Site 

FC Barcelona
RCD Espanyol
Football in Barcelona
Barcelona
Politics and sports
Recurring sporting events established in 1901